Stefan Wolpe (25 August 1902, Berlin – 4 April 1972, New York City) was a German-Jewish-American composer. He was associated with interdisciplinary modernism, with affiliations ranging from the Bauhaus, Berlin agitprop theater and the kibbutz movement to the Eighth Street Artists' Club, Black Mountain College, and the Darmstadt Summer Courses for New Music. He lived and worked in Berlin (1902–1933) until the Nazi seizure of power forced him to move first to Vienna (1933–34) and Jerusalem (1934–38) before settling in New York City (1938–72). In works such as Battle Piece (1942/1947) and "In a State of Flight" in Enactments for Three Pianos (1953), he responded self-consciously to the circumstances of his uprooted life, a theme he also explored extensively in voluminous diaries, correspondence, and lectures. His densely eclectic music absorbed ideas and idioms from diverse artistic milieus, including post-tonality, bebop, and Arab classical musics.

Life
Wolpe was born in Berlin. He attended the Klindworth-Scharwenka Conservatory from the age of fourteen, and the Berlin Hochschule für Musik in 1920–21. He studied composition under Franz Schreker and was also a pupil of Ferruccio Busoni. He also studied at the Bauhaus circa 1923, and met some of the dadaists, setting Kurt Schwitters's poem An Anna Blume to music.

In 1928, Wolpe's first opera, Zeus und Elida, premiered in Berlin. This soon was followed by two more operas in 1929, Schöne Geschichten and Anna Blume. In 1927, he married the artist Ola Okuniewska from Czechoslavakia and their daughter, Katharina Wolpe was born in 1931 but the couple had separated. His wife escaped to London in 1938, but his daughter was a de facto orphan in Berne during the war.

The music Wolpe was writing between 1929 and 1933 was dissonant, using Arnold Schoenberg's twelve-tone technique. However, possibly influenced by Paul Hindemith's concept of Gebrauchsmusik (music that serves a social function), and as an avid socialist, he wrote a number of pieces for workers' unions and communist theatre groups. For these, he made his style more accessible, incorporating elements of jazz and popular music.

When the Nazis came to power in Germany, Wolpe, a Jew and a communist, fled the country, passing through Romania and Russia en route to Austria in 1933–34, where he met and studied with Anton Webern. He had left Germany with a Romanian pianist and he married Irma Schoenberg in Vienna. He later moved to Palestine in 1934–38, where he wrote simple songs for the kibbutzim. The music he was writing for concert performance, however, remained complex and atonal. Partly because of this, his teaching contract with the Palestine Conservatoire was not renewed for the 1938–39 school year.

In 1938, Wolpe moved to New York City. He briefly met his daughter in London in 1946. There, during the fifties, he associated with the abstract expressionist painters. He was introduced to them by his third wife, the poet Hilda Morley. From 1952 to 1956 he was director of music at Black Mountain College. On January 24, 1956, he was appointed to the faculty at the C.W. Post College of Long Island University in Brookville, New York. He also lectured at the summer schools in Darmstadt in Germany. His pupils included Jack Behrens, Herbert Brün, Morton Feldman, David Tudor, Matthew Greenbaum, John Carisi, M. William Karlins, Gil Evans, George Russell, Robert D. Levin, Boyd McDonald, Ralph Shapey, Ursula Mamlok, Netty Simons, and Beatrice Witkin.

His works from this time sometimes used the twelve-tone technique, were sometimes diatonic, were sometimes based on the Arabic scales (such as maqam saba) he had heard in Palestine and sometimes employed some other method of tonal organisation.

Wolpe developed Parkinson's disease in 1964, and died in New York City in 1972.

Music 

Elliott Carter said of Wolpe's music that, "he does everything wrong and it comes out right."

References

Further reading
 Stefan Wolpe: Das Ganze überdenken. Vorträge über Musik 1935–1962, edited by Thomas Phleps (Quellentexte zur Musik des 20. Jahrhunderts 7.1). Saarbrücken: PFAU-Verlag, 2002.
 Thomas Phleps: "'An Anna Blume' – Ein vollchromatisiertes Liebesgedicht von Kurt Schwitters und Stefan Wolpe". In: Zwischen Aufklärung & Kulturindustrie. Festschrift für Georg Knepler zum 85. Geburtstag. Vol. I: Musik/Geschichte, edited by Hanns-Werner Heister, Karin Heister-Grech, and Gerhart Scheit, 157–77. Hamburg: von Bockel 1993.
 Thomas Phleps: "Stefan Wolpe – Von Dada, Anna & anderem". Neue Zeitschrift für Musik 155 (1994) no. 3: .
 Thomas Phleps: "Stefan Wolpes 'Stehende Musik'". Dissonanz/Dissonance no. 41 (August 1994), pp. 9–14.
 Thomas Phleps: "Stefan Wolpe – Drei kleinere Canons in der Umkehrung zweier 12tönig correspondierender Hexachorde für Viola und Violoncello op. 24a". In: Klassizistische Moderne. Eine Begleitpublikation zur Konzertreihe im Rahmen der Veranstaltungen "10 Jahre Paul Sacher Stiftung", edited by Felix Meyer. pp. 143–44. Winterthur: Amadeus, 1996.
 Thomas Phleps: "Wo es der Musik die Sprache verschlägt... – "Zeus und Elida" und "Schöne Geschichten" von Stefan Wolpe". Neue Zeitschrift für Musik 158 (1997) no. 6, pp. 48–51.
 Thomas Phleps: "'Outsider im besten Sinne des Wortes': Stefan Wolpes Einblicke ins Komponieren in Darmstadt und anderswo". In Stefan Wolpe: Das Ganze überdenken. Vorträge über Musik 1935–1962, edited by Thomas Phleps, . (Quellentexte zur Musik des 20. Jahrhunderts Bd. 7.1). Saarbrücken: PFAU-Verlag, 2002.
 Thomas Phleps: "Music Contents and Speech Contents in the Political Compositions of Eisler, Wolpe, and Vladimir Vogel". In: On the Music of Stefan Wolpe: Essays and Recollections, edited by Austin Clarkson, . (Dimension & Diversity Series 6). Hillsdale, NY: Pendragon Press, 2003.
 Brigid Cohen: Stefan Wolpe and the Avant-Garde Diaspora. New York: Cambridge University Press, 2012.
 Nora Born: Stefan Wolpe, in the Lexikon verfolgter Musiker und Musikerinnen der NS-Zeit, Claudia Maurer Zenck, Peter Petersen (ed.), Hamburg: Universität Hamburg, 2012 (https://www.lexm.uni-hamburg.de/object/lexm_lexmperson_00002691).

External links
The Stefan Wolpe Society
Peermusic Classical: Stefan Wolpe Composer's Publisher and Biography
Discography
 Thomas Phleps: Stefan Wolpe – Eine Einführung
 Thomas Phleps: Stefan Wolpes politische Musik
 Thomas Phleps: Schöne Geschichten und Zeus und Elida – Zwei Opern von Stefan Wolpe
 
 Stefan Wolpe
 Recollections of Stefan Wolpe by former students and friends, Edited by Austin Clarkson
Carol Baron research files on Stefan Wolpe, 1933–1976, 2009 Music Division, The New York Public Library.
Recollections of Stefan Wolpe by M. William Karlins, August 17, 1992

Listening
 Starr Auditorium, Tate Modern: The Music of Stefan Wolpe (The evening's performers were pianist Nicolas Hodges and violinist Mieko Kanno. Leading Wolpe scholar Austin Clarkson and concert pianist Katharina Wolpe, the composer's daughter, took part in the discussion)
 Art of the States: Stefan Wolpe three works by the composer

1902 births
1972 deaths
20th-century classical composers
Musicians from Berlin
Bauhaus alumni
Jewish emigrants from Nazi Germany to Mandatory Palestine
Jewish American classical composers
German opera composers
Male opera composers
American opera composers
Pupils of Paul Juon
Jewish emigrants from Nazi Germany to the United States
Pupils of Franz Schreker
Pupils of Ferruccio Busoni
Pupils of Anton Webern
Twelve-tone and serial composers
Deaths from Parkinson's disease
Neurological disease deaths in New York (state)
Black Mountain College faculty
German male classical composers
American male classical composers
American classical composers
20th-century German composers
Klindworth-Scharwenka Conservatory alumni
20th-century American composers
Burials at Green River Cemetery
20th-century American male musicians
20th-century American Jews